Over-investing in finance, particularly personal finance, refers to the practice of investing more into an asset than what that asset is worth on the open market. It is cited most frequently in reference to expensive personal consumable investments such as houses, automobiles, and trailers.

Example
If a homeowner makes additions or improvements to her house to the point that the owner has invested considerably more than the market value of other houses in that area, then she has likely over-invested in that house. The "neighbourhood effect" will serve to devalue the house so that it is worth less than what has been invested in it. Another example is a person who buys a used car for $2000, spends another $2000 on repairs, even though the 10-year-old car will never be worth more than $3000 on the open market; they may have over-invested in the car by $1000.

Avoiding
Over-investing typically occurs in assets that are partly investment goods and partially consumption goods. Houses and cars are investment goods in the sense that the purchaser expects to be able to resell the asset in the future. They are also consumption goods in the sense that the owner is able to use the asset while he owns it. It is because of this consumption component that people tend to over-invest. They are using criteria other than purely financial ones when deciding how much to invest into the asset. They are prepared to spend more on a house or car than it is worth on the open market because they derive benefits from using them. Because of the confusion between consuming and investing, they may over-invest or under-invest compared to what they would do if the investment were clear. Another major problem is that people spend more on consumption value (such as home rent) because they own the asset and mistakenly think that they are investing, when really they are consuming a house bigger than the one they would normally rent. Although they gain something from consuming more, since it is more than they would normally consume, they are wasting some money on something they would not normally buy, and thus in a sense over-investing by over-consuming.

See also
 List of finance topics

Investment